Jack McKay may refer to:

Jack McKay (footballer, born 1885) (1885–?), English football outside left for Hebburn Argyle, Birmingham and Blyth Spartans
Jack McKay (footballer, born 1996), Scottish football forward for York City
Jack McKay (coach) (1886–?), American college football and basketball coach

See also
John MacKay (disambiguation)
John Mackey (disambiguation)
John Mackie (disambiguation)
John McKay (disambiguation)